HTMS Pattani is one of two Pattani-class offshore patrol vessels currently commissioned by the Royal Thai Navy.

Under a May 2002 agreement, the China State Shipbuilding Corporation built the Pattani and her sister ship HTMS Naratiwat at the Hudong-Zhonghua Shipyard in Shanghai. Pattani was launched in 2004 and delivered to the Royal Thai Navy on 16 December 2005.

On 10 September 2010, Pattani and the support ship  departed Sattahip Naval Base with a total of "351 sailors and 20 special warfare troops" to join anti-piracy efforts in the Gulf of Aden. "The mission marks the first time Thailand has sent forces overseas to protect its own interest." As part of multi-national Combined Task Force 151, Pattani and especially Similan "disrupted pirate activity" in two separate incidents on 23 October 2010. On 20 January 2011, both ships returned to port after a tour of duty of 137 days.

On 9 March 2014, Pattani was deployed along with AgustaWestland Super Lynx 300 in search and rescue operations of Malaysia Airlines Flight 370.

Notes

References

2005 ships
Ships built in China
Patrol vessels of the Royal Thai Navy